Lamsang (also spelt as Lamshang) is a town and a nagar panchayat in Imphal West district in the Indian state of Manipur.

Demographics
 India census, Lamshang had a population of 6530. Males constitute 50% of the population and females 50%. Lamshang has an average literacy rate of 61%, higher than the national average of 59.5%: male literacy is 69%, and female literacy is 53%. In Lamshang, 13% of the population is under 6 years of age.

Politics
Lamsang is part of Inner Manipur (Lok Sabha constituency).

References

Cities and towns in Imphal West district